Grand Imperial may refer to:

 Grand Imperial (album), a 2006 album by Aceyalone
 Grand Imperial Hotel, a hotel in Kampala, Uganda
 Neocheritra amrita (grand imperial), a butterfly in the family Lycaenidae